François Rozet,  (25 March 1899 – 8 April 1994) was a French-born Canadian actor.

Rozet was born March 25, 1899 in Villars-les-Dombes, Ain, Rhône-Alpes, France and died in Montréal, Québec, Canada.

In 1971, he was made an Officer of the Order of Canada "for his contribution to French theatre".

Filmography

References

External links
 

1899 births
1994 deaths
French Quebecers
Canadian male film actors
Canadian male silent film actors
Officers of the Order of Canada
Canadian male stage actors
French emigrants to Quebec
French male film actors
French male silent film actors
20th-century French male actors
20th-century Canadian male actors
Burials at Notre Dame des Neiges Cemetery